Eduardo Verástegui is the self-titled solo album of Eduardo Verástegui recorded in Miami, Florida after he split up with the Mexican boy band / vocal band Kairo made up of Jean Paul Forat Morales and Francisco Carlos Zorrilla González. Verástegui had already two albums successful albums with Kairo: Signo del tiempo in 1994 and  Gaudium in 1995 and compilation albums Cara a cara in 1996 (jointly with Magneto and Éxitos in 1997.

The album was released on December 7, 2001, as an Audio CD by Universal Latino record label. It was also released later on Audio cassette format.

It remains the only solo album of Verástegui as he moved on to an acting career.

Track listing
"Yo no se perder (4:54) 
"Estoy aquí por ti (4:42)
"Tequila" (4:14)
"Vivo la locura (5:14) 
"Luces de la ciudad" (3:29)
"Por Ti" (4:25)
"Baila" (3:29)
"Por la falta de tu amor" (4:20)
"A partir de hoy" (3:51)
"Suave" (4:05)

2001 debut albums
Spanish-language albums